Pruta is the Hebrew term for a low-value coin, and it may refer to:

 Halachic prutah
 Israeli pruta

Prutas may refer to:

 Prutaš, a peak of the Durmitor massif in Montenegro
 Lake Prūtas, a lake on the Belarus–Lithuania border